Ruben Parnell Brown (born February 13, 1972) is a former American football guard who played in the National Football League (NFL) for 13 seasons. He was drafted by the Buffalo Bills 14th overall in the 1995 NFL Draft. He played college football at Pittsburgh.

Brown played nine seasons for the Bills and four more for the Chicago Bears, starting all 181 games in which he played. He was a four-time All-Pro and nine-time Pro Bowl selection, including eight consecutive Pro Bowl selections with the Bills from 1996 to 2003. He is the older brother of former NFL linebacker Cornell Brown.

Brown attended E. C. Glass High School in Lynchburg, Virginia.

Professional career

Buffalo Bills
Brown gained acclaim as the starting left guard for the Buffalo Bills. Brown was named to eight consecutive AFC Pro Bowl teams from 1996 to 2003.

Brown was also a 4-time 2nd-team All-Pro.

Brown also played in the infamous “Home run throw back” game against the Titans.

Was honored 3 times as the Bills’ nominee for the Walter Payton Man of The Year award.

Chicago Bears
Brown then signed with the Chicago Bears in 2004. That season, he started only nine games due to injuries. He had a revival in his career in the 2006 season after the Bears made Super Bowl XLI, and was named to the 2007 Pro Bowl.  In 2007, Brown played in 8 games before being placed on injured reserve by the Bears on November 8, 2007 due to an injured shoulder.

Brown became a free agent after the 2007 season. He had stated he would like to return to the Bears in the future but was uncertain whether he would actually return, commenting that he enjoyed his three-year stint with the Bears, and that it rejuvenated his career. The Bears did not plan on offering Brown a contract.

Retirement
After spending the 2008 season out of football, Brown officially announced his retirement on February 2, 2009.

Broadcasting career
Brown currently co-hosts The Enforcers, a weekly television show in Buffalo, NY, with former Buffalo Sabres player Rob Ray. Brown is also a regular pundit on Canadian talkshow "Off the Record", which airs on TSN. He also served as an analyst for the syndication network broadcasting the Fall Experimental Football League.

Brown has co-hosted, along with Mike Catalana, Bills Tonight, the Bills' official weekly post game on MSG Western New York, since 2016.

References

External links
 Official website
 Chicago Bears bio

People from Englewood, New Jersey
Sportspeople from Virginia
American football offensive tackles
American football offensive guards
Pittsburgh Panthers football players
Buffalo Bills players
Chicago Bears players
American Conference Pro Bowl players
National Conference Pro Bowl players
1972 births
Living people
Ed Block Courage Award recipients